John Law Sneed (1861 in Shelby County, Tennessee – December 27, 1898 in Jackson, Tennessee) was a Major League Baseball outfielder. He played all or part of three seasons in the major leagues.

After just nine games, he was picked up by the Columbus Solons, where he was installed as the team's regular right fielder. Overall, 1890 was Sneed's best season statistically, as he batted .286 with 2 home runs and 69 RBI.

In , Sneed remained the Solons' regular right fielder for most of the season. He played 99 games, but his batting average slipped to .257. The Solons and the AA folded at the end of the season, and Sneed never played in the majors after that.

Sources

1861 births
1898 deaths
Major League Baseball right fielders
Indianapolis Hoosiers (AA) players
Toledo Maumees players
Columbus Solons players
19th-century baseball players
Minor league baseball managers
Nashville Americans players
Memphis Grays players
Memphis Browns players
Topeka (minor league baseball) players
Sioux City Corn Huskers players
New Orleans Pelicans (baseball) players
Toledo Black Pirates players
Baseball players from Tennessee
People from Shelby County, Tennessee